The 1935 European Rowing Championships were rowing championships for men held on the Berlin-Grünau Regatta Course in the German capital of Berlin. The event was a test run for the rowing part of the 1936 Summer Olympics that were to be held at the same venue. The rowers competed in all seven Olympic boat classes (M1x, M2x, M2-, M2+, M4-, M4+, M8+).

Medal summary

References

European Rowing Championships
European Rowing Championships
Rowing
Rowing
European Rowing Championships
Rowing
Sports competitions in Berlin